Branko Čalović (23 December 1941 – 24 July 1995) was a Yugoslav professional footballer, who played as a midfielder. He started his career in FK Sutjeska Nikšić in 1959. Later on he played for HNK Rijeka, NK Orijent and KAA Gent. Čalović was voted "Top 10 most successful athletes of Montenegro" from 1960 to 1970.

See also
List of HNK Rijeka players

References

Yugoslav footballers
HNK Rijeka players
1941 births
FK Sutjeska Nikšić players
HNK Orijent players
K.A.A. Gent players
1995 deaths
People from Nikšić
Association football midfielders